Etchingham is an English village in East Sussex. Etchingham may also refer to:

Places
Etchingham railway station, railway station on the Hastings Line in East Sussex, England

People
Julie Etchingham, English television journalist
Kathy Etchingham, British/Irish personality from the Swinging London era of the 1960s
Seán Etchingham (1868–1923), Irish Sinn Féin politician

Other uses
HMS Etchingham (M2625), one of 93 ships of the Ham-class of inshore minesweepers
Etchingham Steam Band, 1970s English folk group formed by Ashley Hutchings